Lunatique is the third studio album recorded by French singer Jenifer Bartoli. It was released on November 5, 2007, and contains the hit singles "Tourner ma page", "Comme un hic" and "Si c'est une île". The album topped the chart in France, and was also a success in Belgium (Wallonia), earning a Gold certification.

The music of this album was composed by Jenifer and her husband, Maxim Nucci. However, it also contained collaborations with lyricist David Verlant, who wrote almost all the songs. Matthieu Chedid participated in the song "Touche-moi" and other titles, playing the guitar and the French actor Guillaume Canet participated in "Nos futurs". The strings and brass were arranged by Simon Hale and recorded at the Angel studio in London. The mixing of the album was done by Bob Clearmountain.

Track listing

Album credits

Personnel
Maxime Garoute: drums
Jérôme Goldet: bass guitar
Maxim Nucci: bass guitar, guitar & keyboards
Matthieu Chedid: additional guitar ("Touche-moi" & "Lunatique")
Guillaume Canet: additional guitar ("Nos futurs")
Xavier Caux: programming
Simon Hale: horn arrangement, string arrangement & conducting
Jackie Shave: concertmaster
Noel Langley: trumpet
Tom Rees-Roberts: trumpet
Phil Todd: saxophone
Fayyaz Virji: trombone
Frank Ricotti: vibraphone
Thelma Owen: harp

Production
Arrangement & produced by Maxim Nucci
Engineered by Xavier Caux at Studio Skyman, Paris
Strings recorded by Niall Acott at Angel Recording Studios, London
Assistant engineer (strings): Mat Bartram
Horns recorded by Simon Hale & Tom Jenkins at OldBNB Studio, Oxford
Mixed by Bob Clearmountain at Mix This, Pacific Palisades
Mixing assistant: Brandon Duncan
Mastered by Gavin Lurssen at Lurssen Mastering, Los Angeles

Design
André D.: photography
Fabien Rocca: cover design

Charts

Weekly charts

Year-end charts

Certifications

References

2007 albums
Jenifer (singer) albums